Barnes Township is one of eighteen townships in Buena Vista County, Iowa, USA.  As of the 2000 census, its population was 695.

Geography
According to the USGS, it contains two cemeteries: Barnes Township and Little Sioux Valley.

References

External links
 US-Counties.com
 City-Data.com

Townships in Buena Vista County, Iowa
Townships in Iowa